William P. Rodgers served as a member of the 1859-1860 California State Assembly, representing the 3rd District.

References

Year of birth missing
Place of birth missing
Year of death missing
Place of death missing
Members of the California State Assembly